Maxent may refer to:

 Maximum entropy (disambiguation)
 Maxent, a commune of the Ille-et-Vilaine département in France